Birra Korça is a brewing company, founded in Korçë, Albania, in 1928. The company is a subsidiary of IHB group since 2004. It is the third largest beer producer in Albania.

History
Birra Korça is the first beer brewed in Albania. The brewery was established in the town of Korçë, Albania, in 1928. It was founded by an Italian investor Umberto Umberti and Selim Mboria a local investor. The initial capital for the company was 950,000 francs. The initial production capacity was 20,000 Hl per year. It produced Blonde Ale Beer, Dark ale, bottled water “Kristal” and ice.

After the end of World War II and with the establishment of the communist regime in Albania on January 11, 1946, the brewery became property of the Albanian State, according to the laws of the time. Several reconstructions and renovations were done in the years 1955, 1957 and 1965 and the production was gradually increased. In April 1994 following the change in the political climate, as well as economic downturn, political and social unrest, followed by the liberalization of the market, in Albania the brewery was sold in auction and was bought by a group of businessmen.

In 2004 the brewery was bought by the businessman Irfan Hysenbelliu the president of “Birra Korça LLC”. Soon after this a 15 million euro (€) investment was made to renovate and renew the factory. Since then the brewery has undergone a deep technological and architectural reconstruction. The traditional design has been preserved by adding new elements of the same style. Using the latest Czech and Italian technology it brews 120,000 hectoliters of beer annually, ten times the output of the old brewery. The water comes from natural springs of Morava Mountain. Birra Korca holds an annual beerfest during the month of August which is the biggest in the region.

Brands
Beers under the Korça brand include: Blonde Ale, European type pilsner 4.8-5% abv and Dark Ale a 5-5.2% abv Euro dark lager (dunkel). Birra Korça is sold in bottles 0.5 lit and 0.33 lit also in kegs 30 lit and 50 lit.

Awards

“Birra Korça” holds several quality awards. First award was taken in Thessaloniki, Greece in the year 1928. In 2007 in London, the company received the International Quality Crown Award in Golden category from Business Initiative Directions (BID), a vanity award. Birra Korça is a holder of ISO 22000 certificate which is an international standard intended to be used by organizations within the food chain. It contains traditional quality assurance preventive measures plus preventive food-safety measures.

References 

Korca
Albanian brands
1928 establishments in Albania
Drink companies of Albania
Food and drink companies established in 1928